"You Make Me Want to Make You Mine" is a song written by Dave Loggins, and recorded by American country music artist Juice Newton.  It was released in June 1985 as the first single from the album Old Flame.  The song was Newton's second number 1 hit on the U.S. Country chart as a solo artist.  The single stayed at number 1 for one week and spent a total of thirteen weeks on the country chart. In 1986, the song garnered Newton her fifth "Best Female Vocal Performance" Grammy nomination.

Charts

Weekly charts

Year-end charts

References

1985 singles
Juice Newton songs
Songs written by Dave Loggins
RCA Records singles
Song recordings produced by Richard Landis
1985 songs